The volcanic system of Krýsuvík (or Krísuvík, both pronounced  in Icelandic), also Krýsuvík-Trölladyngja  volcanic system, is situated in the southwest of Iceland on the Reykjanes peninsula. It is located in the middle of Reykjanes and on the divergent plate boundary of the Mid-Atlantic Ridge which traverses Iceland. It was named after the Krýsuvík area which is part of it and consists of a fissure system without a central volcano.

The volcanic system has a length of 55 km, a width of around 13 km, covers an area of 350 km2, and its highest elevation is 393 m. It is one of 4 (or up to 7, depending on the author) volcanic systems situated within the Reykjanes Volcanic Belt. The volcanic systems are arranged en echelon and in a certain angle (20–45°) to the rift zone of the divergent plate boundary traversing Reykjanes.

General characteristics
The volcanic system of Krýsuvík has no central volcano but "a 50 km long, composite fissure swarm", i.e. a mixture of volcanic and tectonic fissures and faults, of which 30 km are volcanic fissures. There are no known submarine fissures of the system which nevertheless reaches from the south coast in direction SW to NE over the Reykjanes Peninsula. The northernmost fissures are thought to reach Lake Rauðavatn  on the outskirts of Reykjavík. There are no ice-covered volcanoes connected to the Krýsuvík system, but Lake Kleifarvatn lies within the system and geothermal activity is found at the lake bottom.

The Krýsuvík volcanic system has a tendency to effusive basaltic fissure eruptions; the last eruption took place in the 14th century.

Eruptions
The volcanic system is centered on the divergent plate boundary on Reykjanes peninsula. For magma, because of the multitude of tectonic and volcanic faults and fissures in such regions, it is easier there to reach the surface. There have been at least 10 volcanic episodes within the volcanic system in the last 8,000 years. These episodes each comprised many single eruptions and were most probably connected to rifting.

Some Holocene eruptions have been dated specifically, especially the eruption that produced Búrfellshraun (ca. 5290 BP). Since the time of settlement in Iceland, which is thought to have been in the 9th century, more eruptions have taken place within the system, all of them in the Middle Ages. 

The Krýsuvík fires were a period of volcanic activity which started in the middle of the 12th century, probably in 1151 and written sources indicate that they ended in 1188. The activity of Pleistocene shield volcanoes such as Þráinskjöldur  and Hrútagjá , as well as of tuyas like Fagradalsfjall within the volcanic system, is seen as separate from the fissure system, although the bigger volcanoes control parts of the topography.

The Krýsuvík system has a tendency to phreatic explosions, often within rifting episodes and/or eruption series. The underground of Reykjanes peninsula is soaked with water (high groundwater level as well as saline sea water in cave systems). There is especially the prehistoric maar complex around Grænavatn at Krýsuvík which has its origin in such explosions connected to a period of effusive eruptions. There was also the explosion of an old borehole in 1999 at Seltún.

Starting on 27 September 2021, an intense earthquake swarm began that was concentrated around the Keilir region with over 1000 earthquakes with a 4.2 on 2 October. The earthquakes sparked concern that a second eruption could begin in the area but it is not known what is really causing the swarm During the overnight hours of 10 October 2021, a strong M3.2 occurring 2km (1.2 miles) SSW of Keilier.

List of lava fields 
There are some important lava fields which originated in eruptions of the Krýsuvík volcanic system since the end of the last glacial spell (last 13,000 years).

Búrfellshraun
Around 8.000 years ago, the Búrfell crater near Hafnarfjörður produced a 18 km2 lava field of large volume called  . Today, a big part of midtown Hafnarfjörður is built onto and around Búrfellshraun. The crater contains a lava channel called  .

Óbrinnishólabruni
The   lavas came 2,000 years ago from some craters near Bláfjallavegur  (Road 407) which have since been destroyed by quarrying. The name Óbrinnishólar  means that there was no “fire” in them during further eruptions in the region in historical time. Parts of Hafnarfjörður (midtown and  ) are located on top of this lava field.

Kapelluhraun
A small statue of Saint Barbara was found at the place. The Kapelluhraun lava field consists of pāhoehoe and aā lava which streamed from the highland down to the bay of Straumsvík near today’s aluminium smelter and there into the sea. The events were part of a ca. 30 years long unrest period in the late 12th century which is called Krýsuvík Fires. This unrest period included repeated eruption series and rifting episodes and is recorded in Flateyjarbók.

The eruption fissures had a length of 10 km and 6.5 km respectively, and the lava flows cover around 36 km2. Today a golf course is situated in the middle of these lavas, seen when looking from Route 41 between Straumsvík and Hafnarfjörður in direction of Faxaflói.

Landforms
The Seltún  geothermal area is situated next to Krýsuvík in direction of lake Kleifarvatn (Route 42) and at the foot of Sveifluháls hyaloclastite ridge. It is a geothermal high temperature area, hydrothermal alteration has led to a multicolored environment. Here solfataras, fumaroles, mudpots and hot springs are formed; the soil is coloured bright yellow, red, and green caused by iron oxidation, sulfur and calcite precipitation. The sulfur deposits were mined in 1722–1728 and in the 19th century.  German scientist Robert Bunsen visited the site in 1845 and, based on research there, proposed a hypothesis on formation of sulfuric acid in nature. 

Also found in the area are the   lava field from the 12th century as well as some Pleistocene subglacial mounds and formations like Helgafell, Sveifluháls and Trölladyngja.

Geothermal activity
In the last several years, repeated uplift episodes and earthquake series could be seen, probably connected to igneous intrusions.

See also
 Brennisteinsfjöll volcanic system

External links

General information
 Krýsuvík at

Volcano monitoring
 Icelandic Met Office (IMO). Earthquake Monitoring. Reykjanes Peninsula
 IMO. Aviation Color Code
 Geologist Páll Einarsson explains geology and volcanism of Reykjanes Peninsula as well as the 2020 earthquake series which partially takes place within this volcanic system. RÚV. 20 October 2020. (in Icelandic)

Tourism
Seltún. Visit Reykjanes. Official website.

References

Volcanic systems of Iceland
Reykjanes Volcanic Belt
Krýsuvík Volcanic System
Dormant volcanoes